Komagataeibacter hansenii is a species of acetic acid bacteria, notable as the model organism for the biosynthesis of bacterial cellulose

Bacterial cellulose
Scientists have figured out a way to produce bacterial cellulose by Komagataeibacter hansenii using only waste beer yeast as nutrient source.

References 

Rhodospirillales
Bacteria described in 1983